Walter George Golvin (February 1, 1894 – June 11, 1973) was a first baseman in Major League Baseball, who played in two games for the 1922 Chicago Cubs.

He was married to Nora Golvin, who was born in Minnesota either in 1892 or 1895. She died on June 1, 1977.

References

External links

1894 births
1973 deaths
Major League Baseball first basemen
Chicago Cubs players
Baseball players from Nebraska
People from Lincoln County, Nebraska